Nepenthes ephippiata (from Latin: ephippium "saddle cloth"), or the saddle-leaved pitcher-plant, is a tropical pitcher plant endemic to Borneo. It occurs in the Hose Mountains of central Sarawak, as well as Mount Raya and Bukit Lesung in Kalimantan. It grows in montane forest from 1,000 to 1,900 meters elevation.

Non-climbing plants from the Hose Mountains appear to have less decurrent leaf attachment than specimens from Central Kalimantan, however the characteristic saddle after which the species is named is fully developed in climbing plants. Nepenthes ephippiata is closely related to N. lowii.

B. H. Danser described the species in his 1928 monograph, "The Nepenthaceae of the Netherlands Indies", based only on part of a stem and an infructescence.

Nepenthes ephippiata has no known natural hybrids.

References

Further reading

 Adam, J.H., C.C. Wilcock & M.D. Swaine 1992. The ecology and distribution of Bornean Nepenthes. Journal of Tropical Forest Science 5(1): 13–25.
 Adam, J.H. & C.C. Wilcock 1999. Palynological study of Bornean Nepenthes (Nepenthaceae). Pertanika Journal of Tropical Agricultural Science 22(1): 1–7.
 Bauer, U., C.J. Clemente, T. Renner & W. Federle 2012. Form follows function: morphological diversification and alternative trapping strategies in carnivorous Nepenthes pitcher plants. Journal of Evolutionary Biology 25(1): 90–102. 
 Clarke, C. 2013. What Can Tree Shrews Tell Us about the Effects of Climate Change on Pitcher Plants? [video] TESS seminars, 25 September 2013.
 Clarke, C., J.A. Moran & L. Chin 2010. Mutualism between tree shrews and pitcher plants: perspectives and avenues for future research. Plant Signaling & Behavior 5(10): 1187–1189. 
 Clarke, C. & J.A. Moran 2011. Incorporating ecological context: a revised protocol for the preservation of Nepenthes pitcher plant specimens (Nepenthaceae). Blumea 56(3): 225–228. 
 Chin, L., J.A.  Moran & C. Clarke 2010. Trap geometry in three giant montane pitcher plant species from Borneo is a function of tree shrew body size. New Phytologist 186 (2): 461–470. 
 Danser, B.H. 1931. Nepenthaceae. Mitteilungen aus dem Institut für allgemeine Botanik in Hamburg 3: 217–221.
 Lee, C.C. 2002. Nepenthes species of the Hose Mountains in Sarawak, Borneo. [video] The 4th International Carnivorous Plant Conference, Tokyo, Japan. (video by Irmgard & Siegfried R. H. Hartmeyer)
  Mansur, M. 2001. Koleksi Nepenthes di Herbarium Bogoriense: prospeknya sebagai tanaman hias. In: Prosiding Seminar Hari Cinta Puspa dan Satwa Nasional. Lembaga Ilmu Pengetahuan Indonesia, Bogor. pp. 244–253. 
 McPherson, S.R. & A. Robinson 2012. Field Guide to the Pitcher Plants of Borneo. Redfern Natural History Productions, Poole.
 Meimberg, H., A. Wistuba, P. Dittrich & G. Heubl 2001. Molecular phylogeny of Nepenthaceae based on cladistic analysis of plastid trnK intron sequence data. Plant Biology 3(2): 164–175. 
  Meimberg, H. 2002. Molekular-systematische Untersuchungen an den Familien Nepenthaceae und Ancistrocladaceae sowie verwandter Taxa aus der Unterklasse Caryophyllidae s. l.. Ph.D. thesis, Ludwig Maximilian University of Munich, Munich. 
 Meimberg, H. & G. Heubl 2006. Introduction of a nuclear marker for phylogenetic analysis of Nepenthaceae. Plant Biology 8(6): 831–840. 
 Meimberg, H., S. Thalhammer, A. Brachmann & G. Heubl 2006. Comparative analysis of a translocated copy of the trnK intron in carnivorous family Nepenthaceae. Molecular Phylogenetics and Evolution 39(2): 478–490. 
 Moran, J.A., C. Clarke, M. Greenwood & L. Chin 2012. Tuning of color contrast signals to visual sensitivity maxima of tree shrews by three Bornean highland Nepenthes species. Plant Signaling & Behavior 7(10): 1267–1270. 
 Nooteboom, H.P. (ed.) 1987. Report of the 1982–1983 Bukit Raya Expedition. Rijksherbarium, Leiden.
  Siregar, M., G. Somaatmadja & D. Darnaedi 1999. Keanekaragaman flora Bukit Raya bagian utara, Kalimantan Barat. In: D. Darnaedi (ed.) Prosiding Seminar Nasional Konservasi Flora Nusantara. [National Seminar on Indonesian Plant Conservation Proceeding.] UPT Balai Pengembangan Kebun Raya, Lembaga Ilmu Pengetahuan Indonesia, Bogor. pp. 107–115.

Carnivorous plants of Asia
ephippiata
Endemic flora of Borneo
Vulnerable flora of Asia
Plants described in 1928
Taxa named by Benedictus Hubertus Danser
Flora of the Borneo montane rain forests